Alexander Zalivin (born July 15, 1990) is a Russian professional ice hockey goaltender who currently plays for MHk 32 Liptovský Mikuláš of the Tipsport Liga.

Zavalin previously played six games for HC Dynamo Moscow of the Kontinental Hockey League during the 2016–17 season.

References

External links

1990 births
Living people
Dynamo Balashikha players
Buran Voronezh players
HC 07 Detva players
HC Dynamo Moscow players
MHk 32 Liptovský Mikuláš players
Russian ice hockey goaltenders
HC Ryazan players
Sokol Krasnoyarsk players
Ice hockey people from Moscow
Tsen Tou Jilin City players
Russian expatriate sportspeople in China
Russian expatriate sportspeople in Slovakia
Russian expatriate ice hockey people
Expatriate ice hockey players in Slovakia
Expatriate ice hockey players in China